Marramarra Parish, Cumberland is one of the 57 parishes of Cumberland County, New South Wales, a cadastral unit for use on land titles.

It was purchased by John Blake for One Pound Ten Shillings Sterling on 6 June 1835. The land had been advertised for sale by auction in an advertisement dated 13 December 1834.

References

Parishes of Cumberland County